Mohamed Musa Gadou (born 1949) is a Sudanese sprinter. He competed in the men's 4 × 400 metres relay at the 1972 Summer Olympics.

References

1946 births
Living people
Athletes (track and field) at the 1972 Summer Olympics
Sudanese male sprinters
Olympic athletes of Sudan
Place of birth missing (living people)